Schefflera tremuloidea is a species of flowering plant in the family Araliaceae. It is endemic to Brazil and Venezuela.

References 

tremuloidea
Flora of Venezuela
Flora of Brazil